Guan Siyu (born May 19, 1994) is a Chinese model and beauty pageant titleholder who was crowned Miss China World 2017 and now is a contestant  for Miss World 2017 to be held China.

Early life
She was born in Harbin, Heilongjiang, China. She also has a Bachelor of Arts.

Career

Miss China World 2017
Siyu was crowned Miss China World 2017 by outgoing titleholder Jing Kong and now she will represent her country at Miss World 2017 on November 18, 2017, in Sanya, China.

Miss World 2017
She competed at the Miss World 2017 and placed Top 40.

References

External links
 Official Miss World China website

1994 births
Chinese beauty pageant winners
Living people
Miss World 2017 delegates
People from Xiamen